The Province of Latina is an area of local government at the level of province in the Republic of Italy. It is one of five  provinces that form the region of Lazio. The provincial capital is the city of Latina. It is bordered by the provinces of Frosinone to the north-east and by the Metropolitan City of Rome Capital to the north-west.

There are 33 comuni (singular: comune) in the province.

Sub-divisions of the province

The most populous comuni are:

History
The province of Latina was founded on 18 December 1934, encompassing mainly the drained areas of the Agro Pontino previously part of the province of Rome. Apart from the Pontine lands, it includes the Aurunci, Lepini and Ausoni mountain ranges, as well as the Pontine islands archipelago. The port of Gaeta and Formia, in the southernmost part of the province, belonged traditionally and linguistically to Campania.

In Bronze Age, complex permanent settlement systems and functionally differentiated societies developed in the Pontine region. This included preparation of fish and salt at the coast and metallurgy slightly inland. Late Iron Age fortified settlements evolved on the Alban hills and Monti Lepini. Small-scale farming and urbanisation developed only in or right before the Roman Age with transhumant pastoralism still continuing. From 350 BC onwards, the colonies of Cora (Cori), Norba and Setia (Sezze) were built. The small peasant economy was gradually replaced by large specialised latifundia.

Geography
Although the smallest of the provinces in the Lazio region, the province of Latina includes a variety of geographical and historical areas.

Hill and mountain areas
The mainland area is, in the south- and north-eastern part, mostly occupied by limestone hills and mountains. Ranges include the Lepini, Aurunci, Ausoni. The highest elevation is that of  Monte Petrella (Aurunci). The climate is semi-continental with hot summers and cold winters; temperatures rarely fall below . The mountains are characterized by small medieval settlements (borghi) and traditionally live of cattle raising and agriculture; however, these activities saw a marked decline in recent times, and today workers usually commute daily to work in Rome or Latina.
Tourism is an increasing interesting resource, attracted especially by the uncontaminated nature and by artistic traces of the Middle Ages (Abbeys of Valvisciolo and Fossanova, where St. Thomas Aquinas died). The main centres of this area are Cori, Sezze, and Priverno.

Agro Pontino
The Agro Pontino occupies the plain extending southwards from Aprilia to Terracina, along the Tyrrhenian Sea. Until the 1930s, it was covered by unhealthy marshes, which were dried up under Fascist government; the area as subsequently settled by immigrants coming from north-eastern Italy, in newly built cities like Sabaudia or Latina itself. The sole mountain peak is that of Circeo promontory. The climate is mild. The Agro Pontino is the most economically developed part of the province, housing a flourishing agricultural sector and numerous service firms and industries. It also houses much of the water basins of the province, like the coast Lakes of Fogliano, Caprolace, and Paola.

Apart the capital, the main cities include Cisterna di Latina, Terracina, Sabaudia.

Formia and Gaeta

Cities rich of ancient and medieval history, Gaeta and Formia were traditionally part of the Kingdom of Naples. They belonged to the Campania region until 1934. Traces of the different cultural milieu can be identified in the costumes and, most of all, in the local dialect, a variant of Neapolitan. Formia and Gaeta constitutes a single metropolitan area with an important port (with connection to the Pontine Islands), a station on the main railway line Rome-Naples. Other important centres include Sperlonga and Minturno.

Pontine Islands

Once mainly used as penitentiaries, the Pontine Islands are now a renowned tourist resort in summer. The only inhabited islands are Ponza and Ventotene.

See also
Roman Catholic Archdiocese of Gaeta#Province of Latina

References

External links
Official website

 
Latina
1934 establishments in Italy